Malička is a village in central Croatia, in the municipality of Topusko, Sisak-Moslavina County.

Demographics
According to the 2011 census, the village of Malička has 43 inhabitants. This represents 33.33% of its pre-war population according to the 1991 census.

According to the 1991 census,  97.67% of the village population were ethnic Serbs (126/129), 0.78% were ethnic Croats (1/129) and 1.55% were Yugoslavs (2/129).

Sights
 Monument to the uprising of the people of Kordun and Banija

References

Populated places in Sisak-Moslavina County